This is a list of settlements in the Euboea regional unit, Greece.

 Achladeri
 Achladi
 Aetos
 Afrati
 Agdines
 Agia Anna
 Agia Sofia
 Agios Athanasios
 Agios Dimitrios
 Agios Georgios
 Agios Ioannis
 Agios Loukas
 Agios Nikolaos
 Agios Vlasios
 Agios
 Agriovotano
 Aktaio
 Aliveri
 Almyropotamos
 Amarynthos
 Amelantes
 Amfithea
 Amygdalia
 Andronianoi
 Ano Kourouni
 Ano Potamia
 Ano Vatheia
 Argyro
 Artemisio
 Asmini
 Attali
 Avgaria
 Avlonari
 Chalcis
 Dafnoussa
 Drosia
 Dystos
 Ellinika
 Enoria
 Eretria
 Farakla
 Faros
 Fylla
 Galatsades
 Galatsona
 Gavalas
 Gerakiou
 Gialtra
 Giannitsi
 Glyfada
 Grampia
 Gymno
 Istiaia
 Kadi
 Kalimerianoi
 Kallianos
 Kallithea
 Kalochori-Panteichi
 Kalyvia
 Kamaria
 Kamaritsa
 Kampia
 Karystos
 Kastaniotissa
 Kastella
 Kathenoi
 Kato Kourouni
 Katsaroni
 Kechries
 Kerameia
 Kerasia
 Kipoi
 Kirinthos
 Kokkinomilea
 Komito
 Konistres
 Kontodespoti
 Koskina
 Kotsikia
 Kourkouloi
 Kremastos
 Krieza
 Kryoneritis
 Kymi
 Kyparissi
 Lepoura
 Lichada
 Limni
 Loukisia
 Loutra Aidipsou
 Loutsa
 Makrychori
 Makrykapa
 Maletianoi
 Manikia
 Mantoudi
 Marmari
 Melissonas
 Mesochoria
 Metochi Dirfyon
 Metochi
 Milies
 Mistros
 Monodryo
 Monokarya
 Myloi
 Mytikas
 Nea Artaki
 Nea Lampsakos
 Nea Styra
 Neochori
 Neos Pyrgos
 Nerotrivia
 Oktonia
 Oreoi
 Orio
 Orologi
 Oxylithos
 Pagontas
 Paliouras
 Pappades
 Paradeisi
 Paralia Avlidas
 Partheni
 Petries
 Pilio
 Pissonas
 Platana
 Platanistos
 Politika
 Polypotamos
 Pournos
 Prasino
 Prokopi
 Psachna
 Pyrgi
 Pyrgos
 Rovies
 Seta
 Skepasti
 Skyros
 Spathari
 Stavros
 Steni Dirfyos
 Stouppaioi
 Strofylia
 Stropones
 Styra
 Taxiarches
 Taxiarchis
 Tharounia
 Theologos
 Trachili
 Triada
 Vasilika
 Vasiliko
 Vathy
 Velos
 Vitala
 Vlachia
 Vounoi
 Voutas
 Vrysi
 Zarakes

By municipality

Skyros (no subdivisions)

See also
List of towns and villages in Greece

Euboea
Populated places in Euboea